The 2014-15 Golden Gophers program represented the University of Minnesota during the 2014-15 NCAA Division I women's ice hockey season. The program advanced to the Frozen Four championship game for the fourth consecutive year and defeated the Harvard Crimson by a 4–1 tally in the title game.

Offseason
August 5: Six members of the Gophers roster were invited to the 2014 USA Hockey Women's National Festival. Among the Gophers attending will include Rachael Bona, Hannah Brandt, Dani Cameranesi, Milica McMillen, Cara Piazza and Lee Stecklein. The six are looking for spots on the US Under-22 team which shall take on Team Canada from August 21–24 in Calgary, Alberta.

Recruiting

News and notes
November 24: The Minnesota Golden Gophers and St. Cloud State Huskies faced off in the U.S. Hockey Hall of Fame Women’s Face-Off Classic. Golden Gophers freshman Kelly Pannek registered her first NCAA career hat trick as Minnesota prevailed by a 5–0 tally. Goaltender Amanda Leveille earned the shutout in a 19-save effort.

2014–15 Golden Gophers

2014-15 Schedule

|-
!colspan=12 style=""| Regular Season

|-
!colspan=12 style=""| WCHA Tournament

|-
!colspan=12 style=""| NCAA Tournament

Awards and honors
Sydney Baldwin, 2015 WCHA ALL-ROOKIE TEAM
Rachael Bona, 2015 ALL-WCHA THIRD TEAM
Hannah Brandt, Patty Kazmaier Award Top-3 Finalist
Hannah Brandt, 2015 WCHA Player of the Year
Hannah Brandt, 2015 WCHA Scoring Champion
Hannah Brandt,  2015 ALL-WCHA FIRST TEAM
Hannah Brandt,  2015 ALL-WCHA FIRST TEAM
Dani Cameranesi, 2015 ALL-WCHA FIRST TEAM
Milica McMillen, 2015 ALL-WCHA SECOND TEAM
Kelly Pannek, 2015 WCHA ALL-ROOKIE TEAM
Rachel Ramsey, 2015 WCHA Defensive Player of the Year
Rachel Ramsey, 2015 ALL-WCHA FIRST TEAM
Lee Stecklein, 2015 ALL-WCHA FIRST TEAM

WCHA Weekly Honors
Dani Cameranesi, WCHA Offensive Player of the Week (Week of November 25, 2014) 
Dani Cameranesi, WCHA Offensive Player of the Week, (Week of February 17, 2015)
Dani Cameranesi, WCHA Offensive Player of the Week, (Week of February 24, 2015)
Meghan Lorence, WCHA Offensive Player of the Week (Week of November 18, 2014) 
Kelly Pannek, WCHA Rookie of the Week (Week of November 25, 2014)

References

Minnesota
Minnesota Golden Gophers women's ice hockey seasons
Minn
NCAA women's ice hockey Frozen Four seasons
NCAA women's ice hockey championship seasons
Minne
Minne